The Committee of European Securities Regulators (CESR) was an independent committee of European Securities regulators in the Lamfalussy process established by the European Commission on June 6, 2001.

The role of this committee was to
 Improve the coordination among securities regulators
 Act as an advisory group to assist European Commission
 Work on implementation of community legislation in EU member states

The other Level-3 committees in the Lamfalussy process were the Committee of European Banking Supervisors (CEBS) and the Committee of European Insurance and Occupational Pensions Supervisors (CEIOPS).

On 1 January 2011, the CESR was replaced by the European Securities and Markets Authority (ESMA), which is part of the European System of Financial Supervision.

See also 
European Commission
Securities Commission
European Commissioner for Internal Market and Services
Financial regulation

References

External links 
ESMA

Regulation in the European Union
Financial markets
Defunct financial regulatory authorities